Greenland Puli Center  is a skyscraper in Jinan, Shandong, China. Construction began in 2010 and ended in 2015. It was the tallest building in Jinan until the completion of the  Jinan Center Financial City A5-3 in 2020.

See also
List of tallest buildings in China

References

Skyscrapers in Jinan
Skyscraper office buildings in China